Rouged Lips is a 1923 American silent drama film directed by Harold M. Shaw and starring Viola Dana, Tom Moore, and Nola Luxford. It is based in the story Upstage by Rita Weiman which appeared in Cosmopolitan Magazine.

Cast

Preservation
A print of Rouged Lips is reportedly in a foreign film collection.

References

Bibliography
 Munden, Kenneth White. The American Film Institute Catalog of Motion Pictures Produced in the United States, Part 1. University of California Press, 1997.

External links

1923 films
1923 drama films
1920s English-language films
American silent feature films
Silent American drama films
American black-and-white films
Films directed by Harold M. Shaw
Metro Pictures films
1920s American films
English-language drama films